Geodermatophilus ruber is a bacterium from the genus Geodermatophilus which has been isolated from rhizospheric soil of the plant Astragalus membranaceus from Xining in China.

References

Bacteria described in 2011
Actinomycetia